Iser or ISER may refer to:
 iSCSI Extensions for RDMA, a computer network storage protocol
 Institute for Social and Economic Research, an institute at the University of Essex

People with the surname
 Iosif Iser (1881–1958), Romanian painter and graphic artist
 Wolfgang Iser (1926–2007), German literary scholar

See also
 Isar, a river in Germany
 Isère, a department in the Auvergne-Rhône-Alpes region in eastern France
 Isère (river), southeastern France
 Isser (disambiguation)
 Yser, a river in Belgium